Vĩnh Hậu A  is a commune (xã) and village in Hòa Binh District, Bạc Liêu Province, in south-western Vietnam.

References

Populated places in Bạc Liêu province
Communes of Bạc Liêu province